The League of American Orchestras, formerly the American Symphony Orchestra League, is a North American service organization with 700 member orchestras of all budget sizes and types, plus individual and institutional members. Based in New York City, with an office in Washington, DC, the League leads, serves, and advocates for orchestras and the orchestral art form.

History 

The League was founded in 1942 and chartered by Congress in 1962. Leta Snow, manager of the Kalamazoo Symphony Orchestra, convened a meeting of representatives from 40 U.S. orchestras in 1942 to discuss ways to improve orchestral music through group action. The League, then known as the American Symphony Orchestra League, was formed shortly thereafter. One of its first actions was to lobby successfully, under the leadership of its executive secretary Helen M. Thompson, for the repeal of a federal tax on symphony concert tickets.

In 1994, the American Symphony Orchestra League reported that 174 women had upper-level conducting positions with more than 850 orchestras across the US.

In April 2018, along with the Sphinx Organization and the New World Symphony, the League of American Orchestras announced the establishment of the National Alliance for Audition Support (NAAS) that prepares more black and Latino musicians to enter and succeed in auditions for orchestras. The NAAS was launched with a $2 million fund.

Activities 

The League provides resources for ongoing professional development. The League provides resources in its career center, including sections on seeking career guidance, finding jobs and internships, league programs and resources, and who works in orchestras and what they do.

Communication to members and representing the drive of the League is presented through several sources, including newsletters and an award-winning magazine, Symphony.

Besides the League's National Conference, the organization provides other meetings at the national, regional, and local level.

The League is devoted to increasing the awareness of and access to orchestral music. By representing orchestras before Congress, the organization acts on legislative policies.

Youth and education 

The League recognizes the importance of music education in growing, promoting, and sustaining American orchestras. It provides information regarding El Sistema and Ann and Gordon Getty Foundation grants and the development of American youth orchestras.   It has created and maintained an entire division of its operation to youth orchestras, including directors from across the country.  This division, the Youth Orchestra Division or YOD, has its own separate leadership, including individuals working in music education and youth orchestra development. In addition, League CEO, Jesse Rosen, and vice president for advocacy, Heather Noonan, composed a resource in advocacy for music education entitled "Enough" Is Not Enough.  Within this writing, Rosen and Noonan present the current picture of music education in the United States, where although the arts are considered a core subject by federal law, they do not receive this treatment in American schools.  They also claim those students who could be influenced the most by a health arts education, especially music, do not have reliable access to such an education in the arts.

Innovation and community engagement 

Announced in 2016, the League's Futures Fund is underwritten by the Ann and Gordon Getty Foundation to advance a wide variety of innovative orchestral engagement initiatives.	In 2019 there are nineteen grants from this $4.5 million program, whose variety is illustrated by a joint Toledo Symphony Orchestra and University of Toledo effort to study the effects of classical music as a component of psychotherapy, an innovative variety of digital subscription initiatives aimed at audience growth for the Cleveland Orchestra and planned presentation of three concerts by the Virginia Symphony Orchestra designed to celebrate and support neurodiversity.

Gold Baton award 

Created in 1948 and given annually since 1958, the Gold Baton is the League's highest honor. A broad range of recipients of have been honored for supporting and inspiring the growth of symphonic music on a broad level. The most-recent five awardees include a philanthropist, an arts administrator, instrumentalists and a composer.

Governance

Board officers 
Officers for 2019–2020 are:
 Douglas M. Hagerman, chair
 Melanie Clarke, co-vice chair
 Steven C. Parrish, co-vice chair
 Helen Shaffer, secretary 
 Burton Alter, treasurer

Executive 
The president and CEO is Jesse Rosen, who will retire from this position in September 2020 after 12 years as CEO and 22 total years with the League. In April 2020 the League announced that Simon Woods, former president of the Seattle Symphony and chief executive of the Los Angeles Philharmonic, will take the reins in September.

See also 

 List of symphony orchestras in the United States
 List of youth orchestras in the United States

References

External links 
 League of American Orchestras

Music organizations based in the United States
Patriotic and national organizations chartered by the United States Congress
Organizations established in 1942
1942 establishments in the United States